The jaggedhead gurnard (Gargariscus prionocephalus) is a species of marine ray-finned fish belonging to the family Peristediidae, the armoured gurnards or armored searobins. This species is found in the eastern Indian Ocean and the western Pacific Ocean. It is the only known member of its genus.

Taxonomy
The jaggedhead gurnard was first formally described as Peristethidion prionocephalum in 1869 by the French zoologist Auguste Henri André Duméril with the type locality given as Sulawesi. In 1917 Hugh McCormick Smith described a new species Gargariscus semidentatus and placed it in a new monotypic genus Gargariscus. This taxon was subsequently regarded as a junior synonym of Duméril‘s P. prionocephalum, although Smith’s genus has been recognised as valid. The genus name Gargariscus means “gullet” or “throat”, an allusion Smith did not explain but may refer to the wide band of teeth on the premaxillaries. The specific name prionocephalum isa combination of prion, meaning “saw” and cephalus, which means “head”, referring to the serrations on the edge of the head shield.

Description
The jaggedhead gurnard has a wide shield over the head, with saw-like serrations along its margin. and it has large barbels on the lower jaw. The head is triangular in shape and flattened with a short, wide process on the rostrum and a robust and sharp spine on the preoperculum. The colour is orange to reddish-orange with  black bands on the pectoral fin and a black edged dorsal fin.

Distribution and habitat
The jaggedhead gurnard is found in the Indo-Pacific where it has been recorded from: Japan south to the Philippines and the Arafura Sea. In Australia it has been recorded from Darwin to North West Cape in Western Australia.

Biology
The jaggedhead gurnard can "walk" along the seabed using the separate lower fin rays of its pectoral fins, glide over the substrate by extending its pectoral fins and use the barbels on its lower jaws to search for food.

References

External links 

Peristediidae

Fish described in 1869
Taxa named by Auguste Duméril